The men's javelin throw event was part of the track and field athletics programme at the 1920 Summer Olympics. The competition was held on Sunday, August 15, 1920. Twenty-five javelin throwers from twelve nations competed.

Records

These were the standing world and Olympic records (in metres) prior to the 1920 Summer Olympics.

At first Urho Peltonen set a new Olympic record in the qualification with 63.605 m. In the final Jonni Myyrä set the new Olympic record with 65.78 m.

Results

The best ten javelin throwers qualified for the final.

References

Sources
 
 

Javelin throw
Javelin throw at the Olympics